Cristián Daniel Taborda (born July 21, 1988 in Santa Fe, Argentina) was an Argentine footballer, who played as a striker. He once played for Ferro de General Pico.

Club career
Taborda has played tournaments as the Primera B Nacional with Unión de Santa Fe (where his career began in 2009) and Gimnasia Mendoza (2015). The Primera B Metropolitana with Villa Dálmine (2013) and Barracas Central (2013). The Torneo Argentino B with Deportivo Roca (2010 and 2011-2012) and Gimnasia Mendoza (2014) and Torneo Argentino A with Crucero del Norte (2010), Rivadavia de Lincoln (2011) and Gimnasia Mendoza (2014). Also the Primera B de Chile with San Luis de Quillota (2012).

External links
 Profile at BDFA
 

1988 births
Living people
Argentine footballers
Argentine expatriate footballers
Unión de Santa Fe footballers
Crucero del Norte footballers
San Luis de Quillota footballers
Villa Dálmine footballers
Gimnasia y Esgrima de Mendoza footballers
Primera B de Chile players
Expatriate footballers in Chile
Association football forwards
Footballers from Santa Fe, Argentina